The 1978 BMW Challenge was a women's singles tennis tournament played on indoor carpet courts at the Brighton Centre in Brighton in England. The event was part of the AA category of the 1978 Colgate Series. It was the inaugural edition of the tournament and was held from 16 October through 22 October 1978. Fifth-seeded Virginia Ruzici won the singles title and earned $14,000 first-prize money.

Finals

Singles

 Virginia Ruzici defeated  Betty Stöve 5–7, 6–2, 7–5
It was Ruzici's 3rd title of the year and the 5th of her career.

Doubles
 Betty Stöve /  Virginia Wade defeated  Ilana Kloss /  JoAnne Russell 6–0, 7–6

Prize money

Notes

References

External links
 International Tennis Federation (ITF) tournament event details
 Women's Tennis Association (WTA) tournament event details

BMW Challenge
BMW Challenge
Brighton International
BMW Challenge
BMW Challenge